The National Orange Show Festival is an annual festival held in San Bernardino, California since 1911 to promote the citrus industry.  At the height of its popularity between 1960 and the mid-1980s, the event ran a full two weeks during the month of March and featured displays from most counties in California. The show was cancelled for five years, from 1942 to 1946, due to World War II, and since 2020 caused by COVID-19 pandemic concerns, although it went virtual. Due to a changing economic environment, the show has been downsized considerably with a local community emphasis, instead of a national or state one, and is now a weekend event.

References

Festivals in California
Tourist attractions in San Bernardino County, California
History of San Bernardino, California
Orange production
1911 establishments in California
Culture of San Bernardino, California

External links 

 Image of a woman emerging from a giant orange at the center of the Redlands display at the National Orange Show, San Bernardino, 1935. Los Angeles Times Photographic Archive (Collection 1429). UCLA Library Special Collections, Charles E. Young Research Library, University of California, Los Angeles.